Franco Abbiati (14 September 1898 – 22 January 1981) was an Italian musicologist.

Abbiati was born in Verdello. He studied composition at the musical high school in Turin. He worked as a  music critic for the Corriere della Sera for thirty-six years.

The award  is named after him.

References

1898 births
1981 deaths
20th-century Italian musicologists